Augustus 'Gus' Damian John Kennedy (born 10 August 1990) is an English former first-class cricketer.

Kennedy was born in London, but spent much of his youth in Australia where he was educated at Christ Church Grammar School in Perth. He returned to England in his teens, where he attended Magdalen College School, Oxford. From there, he went up to Corpus Christi College, Cambridge to read economics. While studying at Cambridge, he played first-class cricket for Cambridge University from 2010–12, making three appearances in The University Match against Oxford. He scored 158 runs in his three matches for Cambridge, averaging 39.50 and with a high score of 61. He was secretary of Cambridge University Cricket Club in 2010–11 and played field hockey, gaining a Cambridge blue.

From Cambridge he proceeded to study for his masters at Wycliffe Hall, Oxford. While studying at Oxford, he made two first-class appearances for Oxford University in The University Matches of 2013 and 2014, scoring 183 runs with two half centuries and a high score of 91 not out. He gained two Oxford blues in field hockey.

References

External links

1990 births
Living people
People from London
People educated at Christ Church Grammar School
People educated at Magdalen College School, Oxford
English cricketers
Cambridge University cricketers
Alumni of Wycliffe Hall, Oxford
Oxford University cricketers
Alumni of Corpus Christi College, Cambridge